The 2017–18 season of the Hoofdklasse was played in four leagues, two Saturday leagues and two Sunday leagues. The champions of each group promote directly to the 2018–19 Derde Divisie. The 2017–18 Hoofdklasse started on Saturday 2 September 2017.

Play-offs

Promotion 
In each competition teams play periods of 10 games, three times per season (30 games per season). After each period the best team which has not yet qualified earns a spot in the play-offs for the Derde Divisie as the period champion. 6 teams from the Saturday Hoofdklasse play against 2 teams from the Saturday Derde Divisie for 2 promotion spots. The teams from the Sunday leagues do the same.

Relegation 
The teams in place 13 and 14 at the end of the season fight against relegation in the relegation play-offs. They face the period champions of the Eerste Klasse.

Saturday A

Teams

Standings

Saturday B

Teams

Standings

Sunday A

Teams

Standings

Sunday B

Teams

Standings

Promotion/relegation play-offs Derde Divisie and Hoofdklasse

Saturday 
The numbers 15 and 16 from the 2017–18 Derde Divisie Saturday and 3 (substitute) period winners of each of the 2017–18 Hoofdklassen Saturday, making 8 teams, decided in a 2-round knockout system of which 2 teams play next season in the 2018–19 Derde Divisie Saturday. The remaining 6 teams play next season in the 2018–19 Hoofdklasse Saturday.

Qualified Teams

Results

Extra match 
Because Jong Twente decided at the end of season to withdraw from the Derde Divisie Saturday and to continue in the league for reserve teams only, an extra spot became available in the Derde Divisie Saturday. Therefore the two teams who lost in the second round of the play-offs were given a second chance. In an extra match, on neutral ground, these teams competed for the spot that became available.

Sunday 
The numbers 15 and 16 from the 2017–18 Derde Divisie Sunday and 3 (substitute) period winners of each of the 2017–18 Hoofdklassen Sunday, making 8 teams, decided in a 2-round knockout system which 2 teams play next season in the 2018–19 Derde Divisie Sunday. The remaining 6 teams play next season in the 2018–19 Hoofdklasse Sunday.

Qualified Teams

Results

Promotion/relegation play-offs Hoofdklasse and Eerste Klasse

Saturday 
The numbers 13 and 14 from each of the 2017–18 Hoofdklasse Saturday leagues (2 times 2 teams) and 3 (substitute) period winners of each of the 2017–18 Eerste Klasse Saturday leagues (5 times 3 teams), making 19 teams, decided in a 3-round single match knockout system of which 3 teams play next season in the 2018–19 Hoofdklasse Saturday leagues. The remaining 16 teams play next season in the 2018–19 Eerste Klasse Saturday leagues.

Out of the 4 Hoofdklasse teams and the 5 highest ranked period winners (9 teams total), 5 teams were excluded by draw from playing the first round.

Home advantage was decided by a draw.

Qualified Teams

Results

Extra matches 
Because Jong Twente decided, at the end of season, to withdraw from the Derde Divisie Saturday and to continue in the league for reserve teams only, an extra spot became available in the Derde Divisie Saturday. This caused a repeated pattern of an extra available spot for all lower Saturday tiers of the pyramid. Therefore the three teams who lost in the third round of the play-offs were given a second chance. In extra matches, each team playing one match at home and one match away, these teams competed for the spot that became available in the 2018-19 Hoofdklasse Saturday.

Sunday 
The numbers 13 and 14 from each of the 2017–18 Hoofdklasse Sunday leagues (2 times 2 teams) and 3 (substitute) period winners of each of the 2017–18 Eerste Klasse Sunday leagues (6 times 3 teams), making 22 teams, decided in a 4-round single match knockout system of which 2 teams play next season in the 2018–19 Hoofdklasse Sunday leagues. The remaining 20 teams play next season in the 2018–19 Eerste Klasse Sunday leagues.

The 4 Hoofdklasse teams and the 6 highest ranked period winners (10 teams total) were excluded from playing the first round. In the first round the second best and lowest ranked period winners (of each Eerste Klasse separate) meet each other, where the lowest ranked period winner has home advantage.

In the second round home advantage was decided by draw.

Qualified Teams

Results

Extra match 
Because Jong De Graafschap, relegated from Derde Divisie, decided at the end of season to withdraw from the Hoofdklasse for next season and to continue in the league for reserve teams only, an extra spot became available in the Hoofdklasse Sunday leagues. Therefore the two teams who lost in the fourth round of the play-offs were given a second chance. In an extra match, on neutral ground, these teams competed for the spot that became available.

References 

 https://www.hollandsevelden.nl/

2017-18
Neth
4